Nothing's Changed is the second solo studio album by Joe Lynn Turner.

Track listing
 "Promise of Love" – 4:37 (Joe Lynn Turner/Tyler/Keys)
 "I Believe" – 4:46 (Swersky/Midnight/Cross/Gian)
 "Bad Blood" – 5:38 (Turner/de Carvalho/Borrelli/Kowal)
 "Imagination" – 5:09 (de Carvalho/Borrell/Lafalce)
 "Baby's Got a Habit" – 3:59 (Turner/Byrd/Mohawk)
 "Satisfy Me" – 5:23 (Swersky/Cross)
 "All or Nothing at All" – 4:22 (Turner/Al Pitrelli/Cross)
 "Save a Place" – 4:13 (Turner/Sabu/House)
 "Nothing's Changed" – 4:49 (Turner/Pitrelli/Held)
 "Liviana's Intro" (Instrumental) – 0:15 (Turner)
 "The Last Thing" – 3:31 (Turner/Swersky/Cross)
 "Let Me Love You Again" – 4:24 (Turner/Pitrelli/Held/Brown)
 "Knock Knock" – 3:51 (Turner/Pitrelli/Held)

Personnel
 Joe Lynn Turner – vocals
 John O'Reilly – drums
 Al Pitrelli – guitars  and keyboards
 Greg Smith – bass guitar
 Derek Sherinian – piano and keyboards (Tracks 1, 7, 8, 11 & 13)
 Gary Cobertt - keyboards

Production
Executive Producer – Mark Wexler
Mixing – Paul Orofino
Engineers – Paul Orofino, Roy McDonald and Dave Saronson

References

External links
Heavy Harmonies page
Joe Lynn Turner Argentina Fan Site

Joe Lynn Turner albums
1995 albums